Fudbalski klub Borac Čačak, or simply Borac Čačak, is a professional football club based in Čačak, Serbia. The home ground is Čačak Stadium, which has seating capacity of 8,000. As of 2019–20 season, the club competes in third tier Serbian League West.

The word Borac in translation means fighter in English. Mainly because of the horizontal stripes, Borac's nickname is "Zebras".

History
At the end of World War I, football began to be played in Čačak. According to some sources the first football match took place in 1920. Six years later, a group of union workers who organized on 1 May 1926 founded the club. Initially, the uniform was red and later was changed to red-and-white. The first president of the club was a carpenter, Jovan Jolović. On 6 August 1932, FK Borac had its first night match under stadium floodlights, with the Arsenal football club. Before World War II the club's biggest success was winning 1st place in the West Morava district league in 1934.

After a break during World War II, the club started up again and in 1946 played in the qualifications for the Yugoslav First League against Red Star Belgrade but lost. Its next achievement was to win the Serbian Cup in 1958 (regional Yugoslav Cup back then) and four years later won promotion to the Yugoslav Second League. The first play-off match against OFK Titograd was lost 1–3, but in the home match on 15 July 1962, with six goals in the second half, FK Borac secured a promotion to the Second Federal League.

For many years Borac played in the Second Federal League but the dream of the promotion to the top-tier competition came through in 1994 when Borac got promoted to the First League of FR Yugoslavia. Previously Borac had failed in three attempts to make it to the top flight, losing play-off matches in 1970, 1971, and 1973. The club has been relegated three times since first making the Yugoslav First League but they have also three times managed to win promotion back to the top league, last time in 2003. In the 2005–06 season, Borac finished in 7th place, the club's highest finish at the time.

2006–present

In 2006, Serbian SuperLiga was established as top-tier competition in Serbia following the Montenegrin independence from state union. Borac Čačak finished the 2007–08 in 4th place, thereby securing a place in European competition for the first time. In the 2008–09 UEFA Cup, Borac defeated Dacia Chișinău from Moldova 4–2 on aggregate in the first qualifying round, and Lokomotiv Sofia from Bulgaria 2–1 on aggregate in the second qualifying round. However, Dutch giants Ajax denied Borac entry into the group stage by defeating them twice, 1–4 in Belgrade and 0–2 in Amsterdam.

In 2011–12 Serbian SuperLiga, Borac Čačak finished in 15th place and were relegated to the Serbian First League. After mediocre performance in 2012–13 Serbian First League, Borac finished in second place of 2013–14 Serbian First League as runners-up over Metalac Gornji Milanovac, with whom they were tied on points and promoted to the top-tier competition. On 2 August 2014, Borac for the second time in their history played a night match under floodlights, defeating Metalac 1–0 at the reconstructed Čačak stadium.

Borac Čačak finished in 16th place of 2017–18 Serbian SuperLiga and were relegated once again to the Serbian First League. In 2018–19 Serbian First League, Borac had yet another turbulent season, barely escaping the relegation zone in the last round of the competition, following the win over Novi Pazar and Bečej's loss to Trajal. In July 2019, the club was expelled from the Serbian First League due to 1.7 million euros debt in taxes and around 270,000 euros in debts to its former players.

Honours
Serbian Cup:
Runner-up: 2011–12

Second League FRY/SCG (3):
1993–94, 1998–99, 2002–03 (Group West)

UEFA competitions
Qualified for Europe in 1 season

Kit manufacturers and shirt sponsors

Current squad

Youth & reserves

Out on loan

For recent transfers, see List of Serbian football transfers summer 2019.

Notable former players
Former players with senior national team appearances:

 Boban Dmitrović
 Ivica Dragutinović
 Jovan Gojković
 Aleksandar Ignjatović
 Radiša Ilić
 Darko Lazović
 Marko Lomić
 Lazar Marković
 Slobodan Marković
 Nikola Milojević
 Filip Mladenović
 Miljan Mutavdžić
 Ivan Stevanović
 Milivoje Vitakić
 Nemanja Milunovic
 Dusan Jovancic
 Mario Božić
 Rade Krunić
 Misdongarde Betolngar
 Bacar Baldé
 Ilija Spasojević
 Nenad Erić
 Omega Roberts
 Darko Krsteski
 Stefan Spirovski
 Damir Čakar
 Vladimir Gluščević
 Milan Jovanović
 Rade Petrović
 Risto Radunović
 Darko Zorić
 Javier Cohene
 Mustapha Bangura
 Eugene Sseppuya
 Mike Temwanjera

For the list of all current and former players with Wikipedia article, please see: :Category:FK Borac Čačak players.

Coaching history
A great number of coaches have passed through the club.  Before the World War II the main coach was the former BSK Belgrade and national team player Dragomir Tošić.  After 1945 the main coaches were Ivan Stevović, Dragoslav Filipović, Prvoslav Dragićević, Kosta Tomašević, Živorad Stanković, Vasilije Šijaković, Gojko Zec, Dragan Bojović, Momčilo Ilić, Žarko Nedeljković, among others. More recently, the club was managed by Dušan Radonjić, Slobodan Ostojić, Mihailo Kolarević, Dušan Marić, Milovan Đorić, Milovan Ćirković, Dušan Spasojević, Nenad Starovlah, Ivan Čančarević, Milorad Kosanović, Dimitrije Mitrović, Branko Smiljanić, Božidar Vuković, Slavenko Kuzeljević, Dušimir Vulović, Radovan Gudurić, Milutin Marušić, Miodrag Božović and Milovan Rajevac.

  Gojko Zec 
  Nenad Starovlah (1993–94)
  Milovan Đorić 
  Radovan Gudurić 
  Slavko Vojičić 
  Slavenko Kuzeljević (1999–00)
  Branko Smiljanić (2003)
  Miodrag Božović (Sept 23, 2003–??)
  Radovan Ćurčić (20??–March 3, 2007)

  Miodrag Božović (March 8, 2007 – Jan 8, 2008)
  Milovan Rajevac (Jan 17, 2008 – Aug 13, 2008)
  Nenad Milovanović (Aug 14, 2008 – Nov 11, 2008)
  Ljubiša Dmitrović (Nov 12, 2008–??)
  Miodrag Martać (2009–10)
  Nenad Lalatović  (29 June 2015—	10 November 2015) 
  Ljubiša Stamenković (2015–April 2016)
  Thomas Vasov (April 2016–May 2016)
  Ljubiša Dmitrović (May 2016–August 2016)

References

External links
 Club profile and squad at Srbijafudbal

FK Borac Čačak
Football clubs in Serbia
Football clubs in Yugoslavia
Association football clubs established in 1926
1926 establishments in Serbia
Sport in Čačak